Ted Alspach is an American game designer and CEO of Bezier Games, Inc. He is best known as the designer of Castles of Mad King Ludwig, Suburbia, 
One Night Ultimate Werewolf, Ultimate Werewolf, and Werewords. Alspach is also one of the world's leading experts on Adobe Illustrator. He served as its Group Product Manager for several releases and published 18 books on it over the course of 20 years.

Early life and education
Alspach was born in New York on February 1, 1968, and grew up in Southeastern Pennsylvania. He credits his father and grandfather with instilling in him a love of board games from a very early age. He received a B.S. in Marketing from Messiah College in Grantham, PA. While there, he founded and published a school magazine there, The Grand Tham, funded entirely by local business advertisements.

Career
As a college senior, Alspach interned at Laser Graphics 2000, one of the country's first graphics service bureaus. This turned into an opportunity in system design and training as the small company transitioned into Teeple Graphics (which enabled printing and graphics companies to move from analog to digital tools). During this time, Alspach designed two popular typefaces: RansomNote and LeftyCasual, the latter of which has been used for branding for Comedy Central, Pixar, and Levi Strauss & Co.

Writing
As a result of developing training curriculum, Alspach began writing reviews and how-to articles for magazines such as MacAddict and Macworld. He published his first book, The Macworld Illustrator Bible, in 1995, which contained a foreword written by Pierre Bézier. Over the next several years, Alspach wrote more than 30 books on graphics and desktop publishing, including the bestselling Illustrator For Dummies series.

Product Management
Alspach worked at Adobe as Group Product Manager for Illustrator and the Creative Suite from 1999 to 2006. He oversaw the release of Illustrator 9, 10, CS, CS2, and Creative Suite CS, CS2, and was responsible for many transformative Illustrator features including Live Effects, Transparency, Envelopes, and the integration of Adobe Dimensions 3D software into Illustrator.  At Adobe, he also authored a patent for vector-based flares.

Alspach also worked in product management at Intuit and Corel, as well as gamification software company Bunchball, before leaving the software industry completely in 2013.

Bezier Games, Inc.
Alspach's journey in the game industry began with publishing several expansions for Age of Steam. He founded Bezier Games in 2006 with the release of Start Player.

Alspach's games range from social deduction and party games to mid-weight strategy games. He has carved out a unique niche with werewolf themed games, from Ultimate Werewolf to Werewords to the Silver series of card games. Alspach is credited as having designed over 80 stand-alone games and expansions.

Bezier Games, Inc. now publishes many games designed by Alspach, as well as other distinguished designers such as Tom Lehmann, Freidemann Friese, Scott Caputo, and Rob Daviau. In addition to being the CEO of Bezier Games, Inc., Alspach continues to design new games and to develop titles from other designers.

Awards
Suburbia and Castles of Mad King Ludwig won the Mensa Select award. His 2015 title One Night Ultimate Werewolf was on the Spiel des Jahres Recommended list due to its revolutionary app integration. In 2019, Werewords was a Spiel des Jahres finalist.

Game list
The following are the games and game expansions designed by Alspach, including original publication date:
Age of Steam Expansion: Bay Area (self-published) 2005
Seismic (Atlas Games) 2006
Age of Steam Expansion: 1830s Pennsylvania / Northern California (self-published) 2006
Age of Steam Expansion: Disco Inferno / Soul Train (Bezier Games) 2006
Start Player: A Kinda Collectible Card Game (Bezier Games) 2006
Age of Steam Expansion: Mississippi Steamboats / Golden Spike (Bezier Games) 2007
Age of Steam Expansion: America/Europe (Bezier Games)  2007
Age of Steam Expansion: Barbados / St. Lucia (Bezier Games)  2007
Age of Steam Expansion: Jamaica / Puerto Rico (Bezier Games) 2007
Ultimate Werewolf: Whitebox Edition (Bezier Games) 2007
Rapscallion (Bezier Games) 2008
Smarty Party - Gamers' Expansion (Bezier Games) 2008
Age of Steam Expansion: Secret Blueprints of Steam (Bezier Games) 2008
Ubongo Extrem Craxy Expansion (Bezier Games) 2008
Age of Steam Expansion: Vermont, New Hampshire & Central New England (Bezier Games) 2008
Age of Steam Expansion: Special 2008 Spiel Limited Edition: Essen Spiel & Secret Blueprints of Steam Plan #3 2008
Ultimate Werewolf: Ultimate Edition (Bezier Games) 2008
Start Player (Z-Man Games, daVinci Games) 2008
FITS Expansion #1: MOTS: More of the Same (Bezier Games) 2009
FITS Expansion #2: LOTS: Letters on the Spaces (Bezier Games) 2009
FITS Expansion #3: BOTS: Big Obnoxious Terrible Spaces (Bezier Games) 2009
Start Spieler (BeWitched Spiele) 2009
Age of Steam Expansion: 1867 Georgia Reconstruction, South Carolina & Oklahoma Land Rush  (Bezier Games) 2009
Age of Steam Expansion: Alabama Railways, Antebellum Louisiana & Four Corners (Bezier Games) 2009
Age of Steam Expansion: Beer & Pretzels (Bezier Games) 2009
Beer & Pretzels (Bezier Games) 2009
Beer & Pretzels: Purple Coaster Expansion (Bezier Games) 2009
Ultimate Werewolf: Classic Movie Monsters (Bezier Games) 2010
Ultimate Werewolf: Compact Edition (Bezier Games) 2010
Perpetual Motion Machine (Bezier Games) 2010
Age of Steam Expansion: California Gold Rush & Underground Railroad  (Bezier Games) 2010
Age of Steam Expansion: Amazon Rainforest & Sahara Desert  (Bezier Games) 2010
Age of Steam Expansion: Atlantis & Triland  (Bezier Games) 2010
Age of Steam Expansion: Sharing & Really Friendly Sharing  (Bezier Games) 2010
Ticked Off (R&R Games)  2011
TieBreaker  (Bezier Games) 2011
Ultimate Werewolf: Night Terrors  (Bezier Games) 2011
Ultimate Werewolf Artifacts (Bezier Games) 2011
Age of Steam Expansion: Australia & Tasmania  (Bezier Games) 2011
Age of Steam Expansion: African Diamond Mines & Taiwan Cube Factories  (Bezier Games) 2011
Age of Steam Expansion: Outer Space & Reversteam  (Bezier Games) 2011
Age of Steam Expansion: Orient Express & Disoriented Express  (Bezier Games) 2011
Mutant Meeples (Bezier Games, Pegasus Spiele)  2012
Enter the Passage (Bezier Games)  2012
Suburbia (Bezier Games, Lookout Games)  2012
Kniffel das KartenSpiel (Schmidt Spiele)  2013
Ultimate Werewolf: Urban Legends (Bezier Games)  2013
You Suck (Bezier Games)  2013
Suburbia Inc (Bezier Games)  2013
One Night Ultimate Werewolf (with Akihisa Okui) (Bezier Games)  2014
Ultimate Werewolf (Bezier Games)  2014
Ultimate Werewolf: Deluxe Edition (Bezier Games)  2014
Ultimate Werewolf: Wolfpack (Bezier Games)  2014
Castles of Mad King Ludwig (Bezier Games)  2014
Start Player Express (Bezier Games)  2014
One Night Ultimate Werewolf Daybreak (with Akihisa Okui) (Bezier Games)  2015
One Night Ultimate Werewolf Bonus Pack 1 (with Akihisa Okui) (Bezier Games)  2015
Suburbia 5 Star (Bezier Games)  2015
One Night Revolution (Indie Boards & Cards)  2015
Castles of Mad King Ludwig Secrets (Bezier Games)  2015
One Night Ultimate Vampire (Bezier Games)  2016
One Night Ultimate Bonus Pack 2 (Bezier Games)  2016
America (with Friedemann Friese) (Bezier Games)  2016
Colony (with Toryo Hojo and Yoshihisa Nakatsu) (Bezier Games)  2016
One Night Ultimate Alien (Bezier Games)  2017
One Night Ultimate Bonus Pack 3 (Bezier Games)  2017
Werewords (Bezier Games)  2017
Ultimate Werewolf: Hunting Party (Bezier Games)  2017
The Palace of Mad King Ludwig (Bezier Games)  2017
Werewords Deluxe Edition (Bezier Games)  2018
Ultimate Werewolf Legacy (with Rob Daviau) (Bezier Games)  2018
One Week Ultimate Werewolf (Bezier Games)  2018
One Night Ultimate Super Villains (Bezier Games)  2019
Silver (Bezier Games)  2019
Suburbia Collector's Edition (Bezier Games)  2019
Silver Bullet (Bezier Games)  2019
One Night Ultimate Super Heroes (Bezier Games)  2019
One Night Ultimate Bonus Roles (Bezier Games)  2019
Silver Coin (Bezier Games)  2020
Silver Dagger (Bezier Games)  2020
Maglev Metro (Bezier Games)  2021
Suburbia 2nd Edition (Bezier Games)  2021
Suburbia Expansions (Bezier Games)  2021
Ultimate Werewolf Extreme (Bezier Games)  2021
Ultimate Werewolf Bonus Roles (Bezier Games)  2021
Ultimate Werewolf Pro (Bezier Games)  2021
Castles of Mad King Ludwig Collector's Edition (Bezier Games)  2022
Maglev Metro: Mechs & Monorails (Bezier Games)  2023
Maglev Metro: Moonbases & Mars (Bézier Games) 2023
Castles of Mad King Ludwig: Renovations (Bézier Games) 2023
Blueprints of Mad King Ludwig (Bézier Games) 2023

Book list
The following are the books written by Alspach, including original publication date (English versions only):
Macworld Illustrator 5.0/5.5 Bible 1994
The Complete Idiot's Guide to QuarkXPress 1994
The Complete Idiot's Guide to Photoshop 1994
Microsoft Bob 1995
Internet E-Mail Quick Tour 1995
The Mac Internet Tour Guide 1995
Macworld Illustrator 6 Bible 1996
Official Kai's Power Tools Studio Secrets 1996
The Complete Idiot's Guide to Word on the Macintosh  1996
Photoshop 4 Complete 1997
The Complete Idiot's Guide to PageMaker 1997
Acrobat 3 Visual QuickStart Guide 1997
Illustrator Filter Finesse 1997
Illustrator 7 Bible 1997
PageMaker 6.5 for Windows Visual QuickStart Guide 1997
PageMaker 6.5 for Macintosh Visual QuickStart Guide 1997
ImageReady Visual QuickStart Guide 1998
Illustrator Effects Magic 1998
PhotoDeluxe 2 Visual QuickStart Guide 1998
Illustrator 7 Studio Secrets 1998
Illustrator 8 Bible 1998
PageMaker 6.5 Plus for Windows Visual QuickStart Guide 1999
PDF with Acrobat 4 Visual QuickStart Guide 1999
PhotoDeluxe Home Edition 4 for Windows Visual QuickStart Guide 2000
Illustrator 9 for Dummies 2000
Illustrator 9 Bible 2000
PageMaker 7 for Windows and Macintosh Visual QuickStart Guide 2001
Illustrator 10 Bible 2002
Illustrator CS for Dummies 2003
Illustrator CS Bible 2003
Illustrator CS2 Bible 2005
Illustrator CS3 Bible 2007
Illustrator CS4 for Dummies 2008
Illustrator CS4 Bible  2008
Illustrator CS5 Bible 2010
Board 2 Pieces: Of Dice and Meeples 2011
Board 2 Pieces: Something Smells Gamey 2011
One Night Ultimate Compendium 2017

External links
Board 2 Pieces archive

References

 
 
 
 
 
 
 
 
 
 

 
 
 
 
 
 </ref><ref>

Living people
American technology writers
Board game designers
American comics writers
1968 births